Hibiscus surattensis, the bush sorrel  or wild sour, is a widespread species of flowering plant in the family Malvaceae. It is native to the seasonally dry tropical (and subtropical) Old World, and has been introduced to many islands of the Indian Ocean. As the common names imply, it is eaten as a leafy green by local peoples.

References

surattensis
Flora of Cape Verde
Flora of West Tropical Africa
Flora of West-Central Tropical Africa
Flora of Sudan
Flora of Ethiopia
Flora of East Tropical Africa
Flora of South Tropical Africa
Flora of the Northern Provinces
Flora of India (region)
Flora of East Himalaya
Flora of Assam (region)
Flora of Bangladesh
Flora of Sri Lanka
Flora of Indo-China
Flora of Malaya
Flora of Borneo
Flora of the Philippines
Flora of South-Central China
Flora of Southeast China
Flora of Hainan
Taxa named by Carl Linnaeus
Plants described in 1753